Infrahumanisation (or infrahumanization) is the tacitly held belief that one's ingroup is more human than an outgroup, which is less human. The term was coined by Jacques-Philippe Leyens and colleagues in the early 2000s to distinguish what they argue to be an everyday phenomenon from dehumanization (denial of humanness) associated with extreme intergroup violence such as genocide. According to Leyens and colleagues, infrahumanisation arises when people view their ingroup and outgroup as essentially different (different in essence) and accordingly reserve the "human essence" for the ingroup and deny it to the outgroup. Whether a "subhuman" classification means "human but inferior" or "not human at all" may be academic, as in practice it corresponds to prejudice regardless (for example, compare the Nazi idea of the Untermensch).

The belief that the outgroup is less human than the ingroup is seldom consciously endorsed by individuals and instead is reflected in the way people tacitly think about the outgroup. Researchers have typically investigated infrahumanisation by looking at the types of emotions people believe ingroup and outgroup members possess. Some emotions are considered unique to humans (e.g., love, regret, nostalgia), whereas others are viewed as common to both humans and animals (e.g., joy, anger, sadness). In a series of studies, Leyens and colleagues have widely replicated the finding that people attribute uniquely human emotions to the ingroup, but not the outgroup. According to infrahumanisation theory, the denial of uniquely human emotions to the outgroup is reflective of the belief that they are less human than the ingroup.

Recent research has investigated how infrahumanisation influences behaviour. In a series of studies, Jeroen Vaes and his colleagues investigated people's reactions to outgroup members who attempt to "humanise" themselves through the use of uniquely human emotions. They found that ingroup members reacted negatively to outgroup members' attempts to humanise, offering less help and withdrawing faster than when the same uniquely human emotion was expressed by an ingroup member or when the outgroup member expressed a non-uniquely human emotion. In an American context, Cuddy and colleagues have investigated the influence of infrahumanisation on intergroup helping behaviour. Examining helping in the aftermath of Hurricane Katrina, Cuddy et al. found that people believed outgroup members experienced less negative uniquely human emotions than ingroup members. The more participants infrahumanised the outgroup member, the less likely they were to help.

References

All articles to be expanded
Group processes
Moral psychology
Prejudice and discrimination